Johnny Bode (6 January 1912 in Falköping, Sweden – 25 July 1983 in Malmö, Sweden) was a Swedish singer, composer and enfant terrible.

After his debut at seventeen years old, Bode recorded hundreds of songs on the gramophone, many of them his own compositions. One of his best-known songs is "En herre i frack" (A Gentleman in Tailcoat), which Gösta Ekman senior sang in 1936. The song later become popularized by famous Swedish singer Jan Malmsjö, who added it to his repertoire. The last gramophone record with Johnny Bode as a singer was recorded in 1942. Bode rebuilt his career several times across his life after numerous setbacks.

Bode lived an extravagant lifestyle than he was able to afford, and was known to fail to pay his debts, and was blacklisted by several Stockholm restaurants. He developed a close friendship with Gösta Ekman, until Ekman discovered that Bode had tried to sell their silverware set to a pawnbroker. Bode was also known to write bad checks.

After being convicted of fraud, he was declared incapable, and put into psychiatric care in the mental hospital of St. Sigfrid in Växjö, Sweden. In connection with the diagnosis, he was sterilized.

Johnny Bode and the Nazi connection 
Before World War II, Bode became fascinated by Nazism, which blacklisted him in Swedish show business for the rest of his life. Apparently, it was the combination of uniforms, marches, and pompous culture that enticed the childish Bode. He was able to get permission from the mental hospital to travel to Finland, where he enlisted with the Nazis. However, the short, fat and unreliable Bode soon became impossible and was sent home with an under-officer degree from the Nazi army.

No sooner was Bode back on Swedish soil than he started to ruin his career once again. By the time of his arrival 1942, resistance to Nazism was bigger than ever. When the famous Swedish actor Karl Gerhard played his strongly Nazi-critical cabaret "Tingel-Tangel" for the hundredth time, Bode showed up in his Nazi uniform, with his degrees on his shoulders and the Iron Cross highly visible on his chest. After that, he frequently wore the uniform on his occasional visits to Stockholm's nightclubs. As a result, the only friends he had ignored him, and he became blacklisted in the Swedish entertainment industry.

Shortly after that, Bode traveled to Norway, where he put up a cabaret for the Norwegian Quisling-regime. Bode promised gold and sunshine and lived a luxurious life in Oslo. Some of the songs he wrote during this period were seen in Sweden as critical of Sweden, especially the song "Har du hört vad Svensken sier" (NO: Have You Heard what the Swede's Saying?). This irritated the Swedish society and media even more. It was very hard for Bode to get in touch with actors who wanted to play in his cabaret, as nobody was willing to put their career at stake by appearing with Bode. Bode himself sang couplets and imitated Winston Churchill, to the great joy of Nazi sympathizers. After twenty-odd appearances, the show had to close due to lack of audience.

Once again, Bode was making himself unwelcome. He drank too much, was stealing and skipping out on bills again. Bode was even taken in by the Gestapo and was imprisoned in the Grini concentration camp from 22 December 1942 to 30 January 1943. He was labeled a suspicious person due to his own claims to be a spy for the Swedish government, but by then his mythomania was so widely known that nobody believed him, and he was finally sent back to Sweden.

The DDR and Austria years 
At the end of 1951, Bode traveled to DDR, where he attempted to make money exporting cinema movie rights to Sweden, and declared himself at a pompous press conference at the hotel Newa in East Berlin in 1953 to be "a friend of the German Democratic Republic." However, he was soon expelled from the country. He traveled extensively and spent too much money, which resulted in him going bankrupt in October 1953.

After a time of recovery in Sweden, he moved to Brussels to escape justice. When the Ministry of Foreign Affairs demanded that the Belgian authorities extradite him, he moved to Vienna in Austria. The Vienna Opera House suffered from major problems at this time and needed new influences. Johnny Bode, under the name of Juan Delgada, came as manna from heaven. His bad reputation had not reached Austria. There he wrote the operas Nette Leute, Liebe in Tirol and 12 Bildern (1959), Die Kluge Wienerin (1961) and Keine Zeit für Liebe. They became successes and were played across the world for many years. With the success came money and fame, but also contributed to the Swedish police finding him. In 1955 he flew to Sweden to serve a prison sentence. A divorce followed.

Back in Austria, however, Bode married the 22-year-old Inge Pelz on the Midsummer Day in 1957. The success in Austria continued, but was no good medicine for the labile Bode. He continued in more wild style. He called himself Kammersänger, an honorary title he had not received. At a press conference in Vienna he stated that he, using a pseudonym, wrote The Blue Danube (actually written by Johann Strauss II in 1866). Finally, in 1961, his young wife had enough and demanded a divorce. Bode responded by initiating a bizarre custody dispute concerning the couple's dachshund. Bode won the custody dispute and was allowed to visit the dog every Sunday. Eventually Vienna caught up with the truths of Bode, and he hastily left the country in late 1961. His time as the operetta king Juan Delgada was over. He still enjoyed using his fake Kammersänger title, which he claimed to have been given "by Joseph Goebbels in the presence of Prime Minister Quisling", if anyone questioned it.

Later career
In the late '60s and early '70s, Bode recorded several pornographic comedy albums, with titles such as Bordellmammans visor ("The Brothel Madam's Songs"), Bordellmammans dotter ("The Brothel Madam's Daughter") and Sex-revyn Stig på ("The Sex Revue Step Inside"). He also, under the name of Johnny Delgada, released a gay-themed single in Swedish and German, with the songs "Vi är inte som andra, vi" ("We, we're not like the others") and "Achilles klagan" ("The lamentations of Achilles").

See also
 Könsrock

References

External links
Johnny Bode-sällskapet (home page) – Johnny Bode Society, non-profit organization in honor of the artist 
Johnny Bode-sällskapet (blog) – Johnny Bode Society, non-profit organization in honor of the artist 

1912 births
1983 deaths
Nazism in Sweden
Swedish fraudsters
Grini concentration camp survivors
20th-century Swedish male musicians